Chris White or Christopher White may refer to:

People

Music
 Chris White (bassist) (1936–2014), jazz bassist
 Chris White (musician) (born 1943), bassist and songwriter with The Zombies
 Chris White (saxophonist) (born 1955), British jazz/rock saxophonist
 Christopher White (pianist) (born 1984), classical pianist, musicologist and repetiteur

Sports
 Chris White (archer) (born 1979), British archer
 Chris White (cricketer) (born 1980), English cricketer
 Chris White (darts player) (born 1971), Canadian-American darts player
 Chris White (lacrosse) (born 1980), lacrosse player
 Chris White (linebacker) (born 1989), American football linebacker for the New England Patriots
 Chris White (offensive lineman) (born 1983), American football center for the New York Giants
 Chris White (rower) (born 1960), New Zealand rower
 Chris White (rugby union) (born 1967), English rugby union referee

Other
 Chris White (multihull designer), sailboat designer
 Chris White (politician) (born 1967), British Member of Parliament
 Sir Christopher White (art historian) (born 1930), British art historian
 Christopher White (technician), chemist and laboratory technician
 R. Christopher White, visual effects artist
 Christin "Chris" White, contestant in America's Next Top Model

Other uses
 "Christopher White" (ballad), a song

See also
 Christopher Wight (born 1959), cricketer from the Cayman Islands
 Christopher Whyte (disambiguation)